Anton Ludvig Alvestad (7 May 1883 – 2 July 1956) was a Norwegian politician and government minister for the Labour Party. Born in Sula, Alvestad was a baker by profession, and owned his own bakery. He was also active in the temperance movement. An active labour politician from an early date, he was among the founding members of the Labour Party of Ålesund. Between 1920 and 1921 he was the first Labour mayor of the city.

Elected to the Norwegian Storting for the first time in 1921, he was re-elected repeatedly up until his death in 1956. In 1928 he served as Minister of Trade in the short-lived cabinet of Christopher Hornsrud. This, the first Labour government of Norway, lasted less than a month, from 28 January to 15 February.

References

1883 births
1956 deaths
Labour Party (Norway) politicians
People from Langevåg
Politicians from Ålesund
Norwegian temperance activists
Members of the Storting
Place of death missing
20th-century Norwegian politicians
Ministers of Trade and Shipping of Norway